The Groundlings is an American improvisational and sketch comedy troupe and school based in Los Angeles. The troupe was formed by Gary Austin in 1974 and uses an improv format influenced by Viola Spolin, whose improvisational theater techniques were taught by Del Close and other members of the Second City, located in Chicago and later St. Louis. They used these techniques to produce sketches and improvised scenes. Its name is taken from Shakespeare's Hamlet, Act III, Scene II: "...to split the ears of the groundlings, who for the most part are capable of nothing but inexplicable dumbshows and noise." In 1975 the troupe purchased and moved into its current location on Melrose Avenue.

The Groundlings School holds new sessions every six weeks with over 300 students per session, with more than 2,000 students per year going through the program. The competitive program with admission by audition, consists of five levels (Basic, Intermediate, Advanced Improv, Writing Lab, and Advanced Lab). Participants must satisfy instructors' requirements in order to advance.

The program takes years to complete, as 18-month to two-year wait-lists between upper levels are common. Students may be asked to repeat Basic and Intermediate classes multiple times. By the late 2000s, students had only one chance to complete classes in Improv and Writing. Failure to pass either of these classes means a student cannot complete the program, nor be invited into the Sunday Company.

Students may be voted into the Sunday Company, where they may remain for no more than two years. Many move on sooner than that. Many Groundlings performers have found success in movies and television, including several who have become cast members and writers on Saturday Night Live, MADtv, Reno 911!, and the network G4 while also being active on the internet, mainly YouTube.

History
In 1972, Gary Austin (a veteran of San Francisco's "The Committee") assembled a group of performers in Los Angeles to work on their craft. They would improvise, perform monologues, scenes, characters, songs, dances, and classic plays.  After about a year, they started doing performances and inviting friends to come and watch.  Word got out about the workshop, more people started coming, and soon a core group of performers began to showcase their material at various venues around Hollywood. 
 
In January 1974, Austin announced that he wanted to create a theatre company. There were fifty founding members of the company (membership at that time required payment of $25 to attend workshops). They developed material in the workshops and performed the best pieces in the weekend shows. The new group produced its first show in the 30-seat basement of the Oxford Theatre (now The Met) near the corner of Santa Monica Boulevard and Western Avenue. Esteemed LA Times theatre critic, Sylvie Drake, was in the audience that first weekend, and wrote a rave review. "This could be the start of something big," Drake predicted.
 
As the buzz about the new company increased, the entertainment industry started taking notice. Comedian Lily Tomlin was a regular in the audience, and she hired several Groundlings to perform on her eponymous The Lily Tomlin Show. Later that year Lorne Michaels, who produced Tomlin's TV special, asked Groundling Laraine Newman to be a cast member for his new late night comedy series Saturday Night Live.
 
Before long, membership in the company grew to 90. To keep the size of the company down, it required selection by audition. Phil Hartman, then a graphic designer, tried out in the first audition. He was accepted but, due to stiff competition, he had to wait more than a year before starting to perform in shows. With such a large company, workshops seven days a week, and sold-out shows going up three nights a weekend, The Groundlings needed a place to call their own.

The Groundlings School of improvisation officially began in 1978 with 17 students and staff members Gary Austin, Tom Maxwell, Phyllis Katz, Cherie Kerr, Laraine Newman, and Tracy Newman. In the 21st century, it has an annual enrollment of more than 4200 students. The Sunday Company was formed by Suzanne Kent in 1982 to further develop the talent coming through the school.
 
In 1975 the company acquired what became The Groundlings Theatre at 7307 Melrose Avenue (the building was previously used as an interior decorator’s studio, a furniture showroom, a gay bar, and a massage parlor). Through equity and with the use of their own funds, company members set out to modernize the building and convert it into a performance space. They battled through four years of red tape, building codes, and parking restrictions before producing any shows on the stage. During that time The Groundlings performed their revues at a handful of theaters all over town, including The Improv, The Matrix, The Hollywood Canteen, and the White House. Finally in April 1979, the revitalized 99-seat theater opened its doors to audiences.
 
In November 1979, Gary Austin stepped down from his position as artistic director. Tom Maxwell was elected as his successor, and he served for the next ten years. In 1989, The Groundlings began the enduring tradition of having Groundlings or Groundlings alumni direct each new revue. The Main Company of no more than 30 members, collectively makes artistic, business and creative decisions. In April 2017 The Groundlings paid tribute to passing of their founder, Gary Austin, by gathering at the theatre and laying flowers at his plaque.

Operations
Students must pass an audition to get into the Basic class. If a student passes the audition, their results are valid for one year. If a student does not pass the audition, they are allowed to audition again in four months. Students are allowed to audition a total of three times.

After completing the Advanced Lab level, a student may be voted into the Sunday Company, which performs every Sunday at 7:30pm. During this time, students write, rehearse and perform new material every week. After six months of performing in the Sunday Company, students are either voted to remain in the company for another six months, voted to be dismissed from the school, or voted into the Main Company (aka The Groundlings). No one can stay in the Sunday Company for longer than 24 months nor less than six months.

All members of the Main Company are selected from members of the Sunday Company. All of the Main Company members can remain in the company for as long as they desire. Usually members do not stay for longer than a decade; most of the Groundlings retire sooner from the company. The Main Company (capped at no more than 30 members at any time) collectively acts as the organization's artistic director, democratically making business and creative decisions as a group.

Shows
The Groundlings Revues (now commonly referred to as the Main Shows) were the first shows performed by the company and they established the Groundlings improv, character, and sketch comedy style. In 1981, the revue was given a title, "L.A. 200, Groundlings 3". Since that time every revue has had its own name, and has the word "Groundling" in the title. Initially one or two revues were performed in a year, increasing to three by the 1990s, and four in 2007, in addition to a special holiday show in December. Main Shows are performed every Friday at 8:00 p.m. and every Saturday at 8:00 p.m. and 10:00 p.m.

In 1992, Melanie Graham created Cookin With Gas, a weekly short form improv show performed by Groundlings, Groundlings Alumni, Sunday Company members, and special celebrity guests. The show continues to be performed every Thursday night at 8:00 p.m., and is now the longest running improv show in Los Angeles. It was followed in 2001 by the long-form improv Crazy Uncle Joe Show, which runs every Wednesday night at 8:00 p.m.

Creation of The Pee-wee Herman Show
Beginning in 1981, the company added alternative format shows to the theatre's regular line-up. The first one was The Pee-wee Herman Show, created and co-written by Paul Reubens as a showcase for his Pee-wee Herman character, which he created in Groundlings workshops and revues. Pee-wee and his friends (played by and co-written by other Groundlings including Phil Hartman, Lynne Marie Stewart, John Paragon, Edie McClurg, and John Moody) started performing Saturdays at midnight, after the regular revues. Quickly the show became a huge LA hit; it moved to The Roxy Theatre on Sunset Blvd and was filmed for an HBO special. In the following years, Pee-wee became a pop culture icon; films, toys, and a children's television show were created about the character. An updated revival of the original stage show (with many of the Groundlings reprising their roles) had a successful run in Los Angeles' Nokia Theatre and in New York on Broadway at the Stephen Sondheim Theatre on November 11, 2010. The production was filmed for another HBO Special.

In popular culture
Groundlings cast on Saturday Night Live and Mad TV have often adapted their sketches and characters developed at The Groundlings into TV audience favorites. Former members of The Groundlings have further developed such materials into shows and films, such as Pee-Wee's Big Adventure, Pee-Wee's Playhouse, Elvira, Mistress of the Dark, A Night at the Roxbury, and Romy and Michele's High School Reunion.
 
In 1998, the Groundlings were given an improv television program on the F/X network called Instant Comedy with The Groundlings. In September 2008, The Groundlings began producing short-form sketch episodes for Crackle.

On September 12, 2011 the Groundlings featured a sketch titled "Resting Bitch Face" (written by Patric Cagle, co-starring Nate Clark, and directed by Mitch Silpa). The sketch was uploaded to YouTube on October 11 and performed repeatedly during fall of the same year.

The film Bridesmaids was written by Groundlings alum Kristen Wiig and Annie Mumolo and featured a cast consisting heavily of members of The Groundlings, including Melissa McCarthy, Maya Rudolph, Wendi McLendon-Covey, and others in supporting roles. The movie was a box office success and nominated for two Academy Awards. In the same year, Groundlings Jim Rash and Nat Faxon won the Best Adapted Screenplay Oscar for The Descendants.

David Blaine Street Magic
In 2006, The Groundlings recorded a skit called David Blaine Street Magic performed in the alleyway behind the theater. After being uploaded to YouTube, it has become one of the most popular videos on the website. As of October 2014, the video has had more than 38 million views and 60,000 comments since October 12, 2006. The skit stars Mitch Silpa parodying David Blaine in both the topics of Blaine's performances and his mannerisms. The skit is written by Michael Naughton and Mikey Day who play the two innocent bystanders in the video.

Members

Current Main Company

Notable Main Company alumni

Notable school and Sunday Company alumni

See also
 The Second City
 Upright Citizens Brigade
 ImprovOlympic
 ComedySportz
 Under the Gun Theater
 Annoyance Theatre
 Footlights

References

External links
 
 

1974 establishments in California
American comedy troupes
Improvisational theatre
Improvisational troupes
Culture of Hollywood, Los Angeles
Landmarks in Los Angeles
1970s in comedy
1980s in comedy
1990s in comedy
2000s in comedy
2010s in comedy